The enzyme ketotetrose-phosphate aldolase catalyzes the chemical reaction

erythrulose 1-phosphate  glycerone phosphate + formaldehyde

Hence, this enzyme has one substrate, erythrulose 1-phosphate, and two products, dihydroxyacetone phosphate and formaldehyde.

This enzyme belongs to the family of lyases, specifically the aldehyde-lyases, which cleave carbon-carbon bonds.  The systematic name of this enzyme class is erythrulose-1-phosphate formaldehyde-lyase (glycerone-phosphate-forming). Other names in common use include phosphoketotetrose aldolase, erythrulose-1-phosphate synthetase, erythrose-1-phosphate synthase, and erythrulose-1-phosphate formaldehyde-lyase.

References

 

EC 4.1.2
Enzymes of unknown structure